Titanoceros thermoptera is a species of snout moth described by Oswald Bertram Lower in 1903. It is found in Australia.

The larvae are predacious on the eggs of Ochrogaster thermoptera.

References

Moths described in 1903
Epipaschiinae